Events from the 5th century in England.

Events
 401
 Stilicho withdraws troops from Britain, and abandons forts on the Yorkshire coast.
 402
 Last issue of Roman coinage in Britain.
 405
 Niall of the Nine Hostages leads Irish raids along the south coast.
 407
 Army in Britain proclaims Constantine III as Emperor.
 409
 Army rebels against Constantine.
 Saxons raid Britain.
 410
 Emperor Honorius recalls the last legions from Britain.
 429
 The Pope sends Saint Germanus to Britain, who defeats the Pelagians in public debate.
c.430
 Vortigern, supposed king of the Britons, allows Anglo-Saxon mercenaries to settle on the Isle of Thanet.
 Fastidius completes his work On the Christian Life.
 433
 The Britons call the Angles to come and help them as mercenaries against the Picts.
 446
 The "Groans of the Britons": Britons appeal (possibly to the Consul Flavius Aetius) for the Roman army to come back to Britain.
 447
 Saint Germanus returns to Britain and exiles Pelagian heretics.
 449 (traditional date)
 Vortigern, supposed king of the Britons, invites Hengist and Horsa, by tradition chieftains of the Jutes, to form a military alliance against the Picts and Scoti; by tradition, they land at Ebbsfleet, Thanet, so contributing to the Anglo-Saxon settlement of Britain (according to Bede).
 c.450
Hengist founds the Kingdom of Kent.
 455
 Battle of Aylesford: Hengist and Horsa defeat Vortigern, although Horsa dies in the battle.
 457
 Battle of Crayford: Hengist and Oisc of Kent (Æsc) defeat the Britons, driving them from Kent.
 466
 Battle of Wippedesfleot: Celtic Britons (Welsh) perhaps defeat the Anglo-Saxons (Jutes) under Hengist and Oisc in battle in Kent and confine them to the Isle of Thanet, but a dozen Welsh leaders are killed.
 473
 Hengist and Oisc again fight against the Britons.
 477
 Ælle lands at Selsey, and founds the Kingdom of Sussex.
 485
 Ælle fights against the Britons near the margin of Mearcræd's stream.
 491
 Ælle and his son Cissa besiege Anderitum, the Saxon Shore fort at Pevensey, and kill all the Britons there.
 495
 Cerdic, later the first King of Wessex, lands at Southampton.
 c.500
Battle of Mons Badonicus: Britons defeat advancing Saxons, and retain control of the north and west.

References